James Arthur Norman Butler, 6th Marquess of Ormonde, CVO, MC (25 April 1893 – 1971) was a British peer. He was the son of James Arthur Wellington Foley Butler, 4th Marquess of Ormonde.

Early life

James Arthur Norman Butler was born on 25 April 1893. His parents were Lord and Lady Arthur Butler.

At the time of his birth, his father Lord Arthur Butler was the eldest surviving brother of James Butler, 3rd Marquess of Ormonde. His mother was born Ellen Stager, daughter of Union General Anson Stager, an American Millionaire.

He served in World War I (1914–1918). He was awarded the Military Cross in 1918. He was appointed a Gentleman-at-Arms in 1936. Ormonde also fought in World War II (1940–1945). He held the office of Deputy Lieutenant of Kent between 1952 and 1955. He was High Steward of Wokingham from 1956. He was created Commander, Royal Victorian Order in 1960. Ormonde was the 30th Hereditary Chief Butler of Ireland.

Lord Ormonde reached the rank of Lieutenant-Colonel and commander of his regiment, the 17/21st Lancers.

He succeeded his brother James George Butler in 1949.

Transfer of Kilkenny Castle

In 1935 Arthur's brother George made the decision to vacate the family's ancestral seat, Kilkenny Castle owing to the rising cost of taxation and maintaining the castle. Upon his accession to the Marquessate, Arthur and his family lived at Gennings Park, the home of his mother, Ellen Dowager Marchioness of Ormonde. Following Ellen's death in 1951, Arthur sold Gennings in 1955 and purchased Cantley House in Wokingham, Berkshire. Following the 6th Marquess' death, Cantley was sold by his executors. The asking price was reported as being £100,000 in 1975.

In 1967, Arthur sold Kilkenny Castle to the Kilkenny Castle Restoration Committee for the nominal sum of £50. The castle had been deteriorating for many years, and much of the contents and artwork had been sold by his brother George and his niece Moyra so many of the rooms had lain bare and empty for years.

Marriage and Children
He married Jessie Carlos Clarke, daughter of Charles Carlos Clarke, a renowned London Stockbroker on 26 January 1924. They had two daughters:

Lady Jane Butler (b. 9 January 1925, d. 22 October 1992) married Peter Heaton
Mark Heaton (b. 1948) 
Lady Martha Butler (b. 14 January 1926, d. 12 August 2010) married Sir Ashley Charles Ponsonby, 2nd Bt  
Sir Charles Ashley Ponsonby, 3rd Bt (b. 1951)
Rupert Spencer Ponsonby (b. 1953)
Luke Arthur Ponsonby (b. 1957)
John Piers Ponsonby (b. 1962)

His elder daughter, Lady Jane Butler was a renowned beauty and celebrated hostess. In 1943, she joined the WRNS, and was selected to go to Stanmore, where she worked with the German code-breaking group that operated the Enigma Machines. In 1945 she married Peter Heaton, a Clerk in the House of Lords, and lived in a house in Ralston Street, Chelsea. She had one son, Mark Heaton, who was born in 1948. She was divorced from Peter Heaton in 1952.

His younger daughter, Lady Martha Butler was a nurse during World War II. She married Sir Ashley Charles Gibbs Ponsonby, 2nd Bt in 1950. She had four sons.

In 1967, he sold his family's principal seat, Kilkenny Castle, to the City of Kilkenny for a token sum of £50.
As he had no male heirs of the body the titles went to a cousin, James Butler, 7th Marquess of Ormonde.

References

1893 births
1971 deaths
Arthur
Commanders of the Royal Victorian Order
Recipients of the Military Cross
Arthur 6
Deputy Lieutenants of Kent
17th/21st Lancers officers